Forécariah (N’ko: ߝߏߙߋߞߊߙߌߦߊ߫) is a sub-prefecture and town located in western Guinea. It is the capital of Forécariah Prefecture.

As of 2008, the population was estimated to be around 21,710.

Famous people 

It was the birthplace of Henri Duparc, the film director.

Mining 

Forecariah is a possible station on a heavy duty railway between Kalia mine and Matakong port for the export of iron ore. One of the mines is at Kalia.

Ebola
Ismail Ould Cheikh Ahmed, head of United Nations Mission for Ebola Emergency Response (UMEER) visited Forécariah in March 2015, concerned about the continuing large number of cases of Ebola. He called for closer collaboration between health services in Guinea and neighbouring Sierra Leone. This was in the context of three quarters of all Ebola cases worldwide being in the combined areas of Forécariah Prefecture and neighbouring Kambia District in Sierra Leone.

See also 

 Railway stations in Guinea

References 

Sub-prefectures of the Kindia Region